Michael Klinghoffer (Hebrew: מיכאל קלינגהופר), president of the Jerusalem Academy of Music and Dance, is internationally known as a double bass performer, conductor and educator. 
He is the author of Mr. Karr, Would You Teach Me How to Drive a Double Bass?, and a series of tutorial videos. https://youtube.com/playlist?list=PLh91LjQoVCp5zCw5WmefvcRmAQhvxTCYw 
He previously served as dean of students, dean of performing arts and vice president for academic affairs at the Jerusalem Academy of Music and Dance, Israel.

Early life 
He studied under Gary Karr at Yale University, where he received his Master of Music and at the Hartt School of Music, University of Hartford, where he received his Doctor of Musical Arts.

Career 
He was assistant principal bass player in the Israel Symphony Orchestra and in the Israel Sinfonietta. He performs solo concerts, recitals and chamber music and conducts master classes in Israel and abroad. His repertoire ranges from contemporary Israeli music, (much of it composed for him), to his own arrangements for double bass, which have been published and recorded.

He has published articles on music education and on pedagogy in Israeli professional periodicals as well as in the U.S. Music Education in Institutions of Non Formal Education was published by MATAN in collaboration with the Israeli Ministry of Education.

Since 1987, he has been on the faculty of the Jerusalem Academy of Music and Dance, conducting orchestras, teaching the double bass and other subjects. He was the head of the String Department, the dean of students and as of 2016 served as the dean of performing arts and as the director of the Jerusalem Conservatory Chamber Orchestra. Klinghoffer devotes much time and energy to working with young musicians from diverse backgrounds all over Israel.

Publications

References

External links 

Drive a Double Bass

Israeli music educators
Living people
20th-century Israeli educators
20th-century Israeli male musicians
21st-century Israeli educators
21st-century Israeli male musicians
Year of birth missing (living people)